In the Blood is a 2014 American action thriller film directed by John Stockwell and starring former fighter Gina Carano in her second lead role after 2011's Haywire. The plot revolves around a 26-year-old newlywed named Ava who searches for her husband after he is abducted on their Caribbean honeymoon.

Plot
In 2002, Ava, a 14-year-old girl from Bridgeport, Connecticut, is woken up in the middle of the night and sees her drug lord father murdered by two masked intruders, before grabbing a shotgun and gunning down the two assailants. Twelve years later, after a rough life and recovering from drug and alcohol addiction, Ava marries the affluent Derek Grant in Arlington, the two having met while attending Narcotics Anonymous gatherings.

After the ceremony, the newlyweds fly off for their honeymoon to a Caribbean island where Derek's family owns a summer home. One evening, the couple befriends a young local named Manny who invites them to a nightclub, where Ava gets into a violent fight with several patrons following an encounter with local criminal Big Biz.

The next morning, Manny invites Ava and Derek to ride "El Viudador" ("The Widowmaker") a mile-long zip-line in the rainforest. Once there, Ava, who's afraid of heights, declines to go down the line, but Derek does, and his harness snaps while descending, making him fall to the ground. Ava finds him in the forest, unconscious and severely injured, but alive. Unable to ride in the ambulance with her husband, she eventually reaches the hospital, where staff deny that Derek was brought in. After realizing that none of the island's other clinics and medical facilities have admitted her husband, Ava goes to the police to declare him missing. The police take her to the zip-line but the owner denies being open the day Derek fell and denies that he knows anyone involved. Ava starts to look on her own.

Meanwhile, Ava interrogated one man at the zip-line, threatening him that she will drop him straight into the forest if he doesn't confess Derek's whereabouts only to get busted by the cops. After seeing Ava's recent actions on a cell phone recording, Police Chief Garza ordered one of his officers to send Ava away from the island via ferry. However, when Ava gets escorted to the women's restroom, she breaks the officer's skull and grabs his key before freeing herself. Ava jumps off the ferry and swims back to the island to continue her search for her husband.

Later on, outside a cockfighting arena, Ava follows another man who was responsible for driving the ambulance that had Derek earlier, into the slums off the street. After a scuffle with the man she was pursuing, Ava knocks him out and interrogates him over Derek's whereabouts at night only to attract unwanted attention from his brother. Despite all effort of interrogating both of them over Derek's whereabouts, Ava ends up killing one of them in which gets the police's attention again.

This time, at the station, Garza orders two police officers to have Ava locked up in a prison for her crimes on the island. However, at night, Ava sees from inside the police cruiser that the officers are attempting to kill her and bury her in an isolated spot. So, Ava breaks free her right hand from her cuffs unnoticed and suddenly strikes back at the officers, killing both of them. In Garza's house, he gets a phone call only to hear Ava's voice via Santos' cell phone. Garza arms himself with a revolver before heading to his daughter's room, after hearing that Ava requests him to met her there.

As soon as Garza faces Ava again, he sees Ava aiming her gun at his daughter, much to his horror. Fearing for his daughter's life, Garza surrendered his gun and finally confessed to Ava that he was responsible for Derek's disappearance. Although Garza admitted that what he did was wrong, he owes the Doctor Elbar after he helped saved his daughter from this one health problem on the day that she was born, ensuring that Garza will not tell anyone else about his wife's pregnancy. When Ava asks again about her husband's whereabouts, Garza explained that the Elbar made a mistake about handling Derek's broken bones and puncturing his artery. After failing to save Derek, Garza was begged by Elbar to lie to the rest of the staff and witnesses that Derek didn't make it to the hospital, as well as attempting to silence Ava, otherwise the American Government will terminate his clinic, much to Ava's grief. Feeling bad for what he had done to Ava and Derek, Garza committed suicide off-screen before Ava exits his house, leaving a trail of bloody footprints on the floor.

At Manny's house, Ava started weeping in tears over the fact that she lost her husband. After getting comforted by Manny, Ava rests up before making her final move. In the morning, Ava makes it to the hospital entrance and kills a female attendant with a chokehold before grabbing her ID and hiding her body in the vehicle. Inside the hospital, Ava wraps Elbar's face inside a red plastic bag while interrogating over what happened to Derek's body. Ultimately, Elbar asked Ava to take a look on at the surveillance screens. In such a surprise, Ava sees that Derek is still alive and is on a wheelchair being hauled into the hospital by a group of men lead by Silvio Lugo. Shocked and infuriated by how Elbar lied to Garza over Derek's so-called death, Ava attempts to jam her gun into his jaw only to be given one last chance to save her husband for Elbar explains that if he dies, Derek will die too.

Meanwhile, the group of men escorting David reached the operations floor to greet Elbar and Ava, who is disguised as a nurse going by the name Kristy. At the operations room, Ava attempts to put the Lugo to sleep before pulling out a gun and subdue all of his men, maiming most of them before getting Derek back on his feet. Lugo explained that he was suffering from a rare cancer called multiple myeloma. He bribed Elbar to find capable donors that have stem cells with effective transfusions with bone marrows to help suppress his cancer, considering that Derek happens to be one of those donors. Nevertheless, Ava and Derek make their way out of the operations room, but not before getting caught up with a gun fight with several of Lugo's men in the hospital's corridors and outside, with Ava killing the latter.
    
Along their escape route, they get help from Manny and a group of kids that used all sorts of contraptions to keep Lugo and his gang of criminals at bay. As the criminals pursued them to a nearby village, Ava and Derek take down the henchmen and Ava has a fight with Lugo. Ava, after struggling is able to win the fight and use him as a shield with a knife to his neck. Big Biz arrives. He takes the knife from Ava and cuts the throat of Lugo, killing him. He then tells Ava and her husband to leave the island and go home. Ava and her husband leave the island on a boat as the film ends.

Cast
 Gina Carano as Ava Grant, the 26-year-old lead character, who's trying to find her husband.
Paloma Olympia Louvat as Young Ava at 14 in the film's prologue and flashbacks.
 Cam Gigandet as Derek Grant, Ava's husband who goes missing on their honeymoon.
 Ismael Cruz Córdova as Manny, a young local who befriends Ava and Derek.
 Luis Guzmán as Chief Ramón Garza, the officer in charge of investigating Derek's disappearance.
 Treat Williams as Robert Grant, Derek's father, who disapproves of Ava.
 Amaury Nolasco as Silvio Lugo, a local crime figure.
 Stephen Lang as Casey, Ava's father, who appears in flashbacks.
 Danny Trejo as "Big Biz", a local crime figure.

Production
The film was shot in Puerto Rico from November 25 to December 26, 2012. Although portraying a 26-year-old, Gina Carano was actually 30 at the time.

Release
In the Blood premiered in the United States on April 4, 2014, through a limited theatrical release and video on demand before coming out on home video two months later. Internationally, the film received a theatrical release in countries such as Vietnam, Kuwait, Singapore, Estonia, Lithuania, Latvia, Ukraine, the Philippines and Japan while coming out direct-to-video in the United Kingdom, France, the Netherlands and Germany and premiering on television in Spain.

Reception
Review aggregator website Rotten Tomatoes gave the film an approval rating of 37% based on 41 reviews and an average rating of 5/10.

Variety'''s Ben Kenigsberg called the film a "serviceable action vehicle", while on the other hand, Nick Schager in The Village Voice described it as a "subpar action movie", that is "grim" and "formulaic", while singling out Gina Carano’s "badass-beauty charm". In The New York Times, Andy Webster also praised Gina Carano but lamented that she was "trapped in B-film depths", hoping that someone would "give her a better script and director". Writing for the New York Daily News however, Elizabeth Weitzman was more critical of Carano, stating that while "an undeniably impressive force" she was "not convincing" as an actress, but noted that the film had "a strong supporting cast, some pretty scenery and a taut mystery". Brian Tallerico from RogerEbert.com'' gave the film one star out of four, writing that the "film history is filled with xenophobic tales of pretty Americans who disappear in foreign lands and the pretty people tasked with finding them".

References

External links 
 
 In the Blood at AllMovie
 

2014 films
2014 action thriller films
American action thriller films
Films directed by John Stockwell
2010s American films